In medicine, describing a disease as acute denotes that it is of short duration and, as a corollary of that, of recent onset. The quantification of how much time constitutes "short" and "recent" varies by disease and by context, but the core denotation of "acute" is always qualitatively in contrast with "chronic", which denotes long-lasting disease (for example, in acute leukaemia and chronic leukaemia). In addition, "acute" also often connotes two other meanings: sudden onset and severity, such as in acute myocardial infarction (AMI), where suddenness and severity are both established aspects of the meaning. It thus often connotes that the condition is fulminant (as in the AMI example), but not always (as in acute rhinitis, which is usually synonymous with the common cold). The one thing that acute MI and acute rhinitis have in common is that they are not chronic. They can happen again (as in recurrent pneumonia, that is, multiple acute pneumonia episodes), but they are not the same case ongoing for months or years (unlike chronic obstructive pulmonary disease, which is).

In the context of the mass noun "acute disease," it refers to the acute phase (that is, a short course) of any disease entity. For example, in an article on ulcerative enteritis in poultry, the author says, "in acute disease there may be increased mortality without any obvious signs", referring to the acute form or phase of ulcerative enteritis.

Meaning variations 
A mild stubbed toe is an acute injury. Similarly, many acute upper respiratory infections and acute gastroenteritis cases in adults are mild and usually resolve within a few days or weeks.

The term "acute" is also included in the definition of several diseases, such as severe acute respiratory syndrome, acute leukaemia, acute myocardial infarction, and acute hepatitis. This is often to distinguish diseases from their chronic forms, such as chronic leukaemia, or to highlight the sudden onset of the disease, such as acute myocardial infarct.

Related terminology
Related terms include:

Acute care
Acute care is the early and specialist management of adult patients who have a wide range of medical conditions requiring urgent or emergency care usually within 48 hours of admission or referral from other specialties.

Acute hospitals are those intended for short-term medical and/or surgical treatment and care. The related medical speciality is acute medicine.

References

Medical terminology
Pain
Human diseases and disorders